The All Points West Music & Arts Festival was an annual music and arts festival held  at Liberty State Park in Jersey City, New Jersey. First held in August 2008, it was hosted by Goldenvoice/AEG Live events, the same company that hosts the similar annual Coachella Valley Music and Arts Festival every year in Indio, California. The event lasts all day, from noon to about midnight, for eleven and a half hours per day. All Points West 2009 was held on July 31, August 1 and 2 featuring both music, comedy and art, much like its counterpart in Indio.

2008 Line-up

Friday, August 8
Radiohead
Andrew Bird
CSS
Duffy
The Duke Spirit
Forro in the Dark
Girl Talk
The Go! Team
Grizzly Bear
Joe Mangrum Art Installation "Pyramid"
Little Brother
Lowry
Mates of State
Michael Franti & Spearhead
The New Pornographers
Underworld
Pawnshop Roses

Saturday, August 9
Radiohead
Alberta Cross
Animal Collective
The Black Angels
Chromeo
Exit 105
The Felice Brothers
Kings of Leon
K'naan
Lily Holbrook
Metric
Nicole Atkins
The Roots
Sia
The Virgins
Your Vegas

Sunday, August 10
Jack Johnson
Amadou & Mariam
Ben Harper and the Innocent Criminals
Ben Jelen
Cat Power
De Novo Dahl
Earl Greyhound
Grace Potter and the Nocturnals
Jason Isbell
Matt Costa
Neil Halstead
Rodrigo y Gabriela
Rogue Wave
The Secret Machines
Trey Anastasio

2009 Line-up

Friday, July 31
Jay-Z
Yeah Yeah Yeahs
Vampire Weekend
The National
Fleet Foxes
MSTRKRFT
Q-Tip
The Pharcyde
Organized Konfusion
The Knux
Ra Ra Riot
Seasick Steve
Telepathe
Shearwater
Heartless Bastards
Flying Lotus
College Humor Live
Arj Barker
Eugene Mirman
Bo Burnham

Saturday, August 1
Tool
My Bloody Valentine
Gogol Bordello
Arctic Monkeys
Neko Case
The Ting Tings
...And You Will Know Us by the Trail of Dead
Crystal Castles
St. Vincent
Tokyo Police Club
The Cool Kids
Kool Keith
Cage the Elephant
Chairlift
White Rabbits
Electric Touch
The Postelles
Black Gold
College Humor Live
Tim & Eric
Judah Friedlander
Jim Jefferies

Sunday, August 2

Coldplay
Echo & the Bunnymen
MGMT
The Black Keys
Elbow
Silversun Pickups
Mogwai
We Are Scientists
Ghostland Observatory
Etienne De Crecy
Lykke Li
Akron/Family
College Humor Live
Janeane Garofalo
Todd Barry
La Roux

Due to inclement weather, the doors for the festival were not opened until 4pm on Sunday. All acts scheduled to go on stage prior to 4pm were cancelled, including:

The Gaslight Anthem
Kitty Daisy & Lewis
Steel Train
PT Walkley

References

External links
All Points West Official Website
All Points West Official Facebook Fan Page
All Points West Twitter Page
All Points West MySpace Page
Official Online Store of the 2008 All Points West Music & Arts Festival
APW Official Photo Gallery
APW Newsletter Signup
Metromix.com festival coverage
HonestTune festival coverage
APWphotos.com Photo Gallery

Music festivals established in 2008
Pop music festivals in the United States
Music festivals in New Jersey
Rock festivals in the United States